Vismia pauciflora is a species of flowering plant in the Hypericaceae family. It is found only in Tanzania. It is threatened by habitat loss.

References

Endemic flora of Tanzania
Endangered plants
pauciflora
Taxonomy articles created by Polbot